DIY SOS is a British DIY television series made for the BBC and presented by Nick Knowles, Lowri Turner, Kate McIntyre and Brigid Calderhead. The series was broadcast from 1999 to 2010 before its current format DIY SOS The Big Build from 2010, also presented by Nick Knowles. 242 episodes of DIY SOS and DIY SOS The Big Build have been broadcast over 32 series.

DIY SOS (1999–2010)
Launched in 1999, after audience figures showed interest in other home make-over shows such as Changing Rooms, DIY SOS was a weekly full builder and designer level renovation of a section of a viewer's home, taken on by a team of professionals after a viewer's DIY project had gone wrong and not been finished. It is the longest running show of its format having been shown for 21 years and has an active dedicated forum.

Launched with presenter Nick Knowles, the format consisted of a main project, and a small project initially headed by Lowri Turner (but after Turner left the show, a number of subsequent presenters were used for the smaller segment), and a viewer call-in vote format voting for one of three families who have made short video pitches for their projects to be addressed in the following programme.

An episode filmed in June 2009 was not broadcast after a domestic incident where a man held his wife hostage at gunpoint before shooting himself, the week before the intended broadcast. The episode is believed to have included the fitting of a new kitchen into the couple's semi-detached home.

Personnel

Presenters
Nick Knowles (1999–2010) 
Lowri Turner (1999–2006)
Brigid Calderhead (2002–2006)
Kate McIntyre (2003)

Designers
Brigid Calderhead (2002–2006)
Claire Rendall (2005)
Deborah Drew (2003–2007)
Julia Kendell (2008–2010)
Laurence Llewelyn Bowen
Gabrielle Blackman

Crew
Julian Perryman - Builder (1999–2010)
Chris Frediani - Plasterer (1999-2010)
Mark Millar - Carpenter (2006–2010)
Billy Byrne - Electrician (1999-2010)
Ian Soo  - Builder (1999–2006)
Dawn Bayley - Decorator (1999–2006)
Garfield Caven - Builder (1999–2006)
Steve Fallowfield - Builder (1999–2006)
Chris Young - Builder (1999–2006)
Kyle Dwnt - Builder (1999–2006)
Warren Furman - Builder (1999–2006)
Bob Grose - Builder (1999–2006)
Mat Skelton – Builder (2008–2010)
Genie - Fitted the chair lifts (2000–2010)
Herbie - Fed the cats (1999–2010)

Episodes

DIY SOS The Big Build (2010–present)
In 2010, DIY SOS was rebranded, adopting the title DIY SOS The Big Build. In doing so, the show became a one-hour programme in which the team enlists the help of local tradesmen, suppliers and the larger community to help deserving families. As the title suggests, the projects often involve "ambitious" construction work such as building a loft conversion or extension. In October 2015, The Big Build "Veterans Village" special achieved a 34% audience share (with viewing figures of 9.6 million), the biggest in the series' history.

Personnel

Presenters
Nick Knowles (2010-)
Rhod Gilbert (One Episode in 2021)

Crew
Julian Perryman - Builder (2010–)
Chris Frediani - Plasterer (2010–)
Mark Millar - Carpenter (2010–2021)
Billy Byrne - Electrician (2010–)
Mat Skelton – Builder (2010–2013)

Designers
During The Big Build, the following designers appear in an alternating recurring capacity.
Charlie Luxton
Laurence Llewelyn-Bowen
Oliver Heath 
Hannah Huggins
Nina Campbell
Gabrielle Blackman
Julia Kendell
Naomi Cleaver
Sophie Robinson

Episodes

Reception
Following the transition to the Big Build format, according to Stuart Heritage of The Guardian, the show is now a "big hitter", explaining that "Pound for pound [it] offers far more emotional heft than almost anything else on television". In its previous format, the show had, in his view, merely "burbled along pointlessly", lacking ambition or an emotional connection with viewers.

Garden SOS (2003)
On 7 July 2003, the BBC announced a sister show to DIY SOS, to be called Garden SOS. Running for only one series, it was first broadcast on BBC One from 4 September to 21 October 2003. Using the same format as DIY SOS, it was to tackle gardens instead of houses. Described by a reviewer as a hybrid between DIY SOS and Ground Force, the show featured a red and blue team of experts sent to work on different projects.

It was presented by television presenter Andy Collins and garden designer Ann-Marie Powell. As with DIY SOS, viewers were given the chance via a telephone vote to select the projects in each subsequent episode. Reviewing the first episode for the Radio Times, David Butcher described the series as "all good fun", but lacking in gardening related content, and suggested this was one garden makeover series too many in an increasingly saturated market. There were six episodes in total.

International editions
The format was sold to RTÉ in Ireland in 2019, with episodes to be presented by Baz Ashmawy expected to air in 2020. The big build brings volunteers, contractors and the community together as one, working together to help people who truly need it.

Controversy
In May 2021, it was reported that Nick Knowles was holding crisis talks with the BBC regarding his job as the main host of DIY SOS due to his appearance in a Shreddies TV advert, which violated BBC's commercial agreements and guidelines. A week later, the BBC announced that they have resolved the issue and Knowles will return to his DIY SOS role with filming to resume in the coming months and he is expected to be back on screens in 2022.

References

External links
 
 
 

1999 British television series debuts
2000s British television series
2010s British television series
2020s British television series
BBC high definition shows
BBC Television shows
Television series by BBC Studios
Home renovation television series
English-language television shows